The 1945 Ohio Athletic Conference football season was the season of college football played by the 13 member schools of the Ohio Athletic Conference (OAC), commonly referred to as the "Ohio Conference", as part of the 1945 college football season. 

The Oberlin Yeomen, in their 16th season under head coach Lysle Butler, won the OAC championship with a perfect 8–0 record (3–0 against OAC opponents). Oberlin also led the conference in scoring offense with an average of 28.9 points per game.

The Capital Crusaders, led by head coach Bill Bernlohr, finished in second place with a 5–1 record and led the conference in scoring defense, allowing an average of only 4.5 points per game.

The Muskingum Fighting Muskies, under head coach Ed Sherman, compiled a 6–1–1 record, finished in fourth place, and outscored opponents by a total of 199 to 44.

Conference overview

Teams

Oberlin

The 1945 Oberlin Yeomen football team represented Oberlin College. In their 16th season under head coach Lysle Butler, the Yeomen compiled a perfect 8–0 record (3–0 against OAC opponent), won the OAC championship, shut out four of eight opponents, and outscored all opponents by a total of 231 to 40.

Capital

The 1945 Capital Crusaders football team represented Capital University of Columbus, Ohio. Led by head coach Bill Bernlohr, the Crusaders compiled a 5–1 record (5–1 against OAC opponents), finished in second place in the OAC, shut out four of six opponents, and outscored opponents by a total of 158 to 27.

Baldwin–Wallace

The 1945  Baldwin–Wallace Yellow Jackets football team represented Baldwin–Wallace University of Berea, Ohio. In their 18th season under head coach Ray E. Watts, the Yellow Jackets compiled a 6–4 record (4–1 against OAC opponents), finished in third place in the OAC, and outscored opponents by a total of 193 to 181

Muskingum

The 1945 Muskingum Fighting Muskies football team represented Muskingum University of New Concord, Ohio. In their first season under head coach Ed Sherman, the Fighting Muskies compiled a 6–1–1 record (4–1–1 against OAC opponents), finished in fourth place in the OAC, and outscored all opponents by a total of 199 to 44.

Ashland

The 1945 Ashland Eagles football team represented Ashland University of Ashland, Ohio. Led by head coach George Donges, the Tigers compiled a 4–1 record (3–1 against OAC opponents), finished in fifth place in the OAC, and outscored opponents by a total of 92 to 62.

Otterbein

The 1945 Otterbein Cardinals football team represented Otterbein University. In their eighth season under head coach Harry W. Ewing, the Cardinals compiled a 4–2–2 record (3–1–2 against OAC opponent), finished in sixth place in the OAC, and outscored opponents by a total of 95 to 94.

Wittenberg

The 1945 Wittenberg Tigers football team represented the Wittenberg University of Springfield, Ohio. Led by head coach Howard Maurer, the Tigers compiled a 3–4 record (3–3 against OAC opponents), finished in seventh place in the OAC, and outscored opponents by a total of 119 to 111.

Denison

The 1945 Denison Big Red football team represented Denison University of Granville, Ohio. The Big Red compiled a 2–4 record (2–2 against OAC opponents), finished in eighth place in the OAC, and was outscored by a total of 156 to 45. The team played its home games at Deeds Field in Granville.

Case

The 1945 Case Rough Riders football team represented Case School of Applied Science (now part of Case Western Reserve University). In their 16th year under head coach Joseph J. Carlin, followed by Ray A. Ride, the Rough Riders compiled a 2–5 record (1–3 against OAC opponents), finished in ninth place in the OAC, and were outscored by a total of 140 to 91.

Heidelberg

The 1945 Heidelberg Student Princes football team represented the Heidelberg College of Tiffin, Ohio. In their 14th and final season under head coach Ted Turney, the Student Princes compiled a 1–4–1 record (1–4–1 against OAC opponents), finished in tenth place in the OAC, and were outscored by a total of 153 to 82.

Ohio Northern

The 1945 Ohio Northern Polar Bears football team represented Ohio Northern University of Ada, Ohio. Led by head coach Clyde A. Lamb, the Polar Bears compiled a 3–2 record (0–2 against OAC opponents), finished in 11th place in the OAC, and outscored opponents by a total of 70 to 52.

The team included several veterans of World War II in the starting lineup, including halfback Larry Archer who participated in the first heavy bomber raid on Japan, fullback Gale Weller who flew B-24s, and tackle Jack Zeller who participated in the Normandy invasion and the Ardennes.

Wooster

The 1945 Wooster Fighting Scots football team represented the College of Wooster of Wooster, Ohio. Led by head coach John Swigart, the Fighting Scots compiled a 0–6 record (0–4 against OAC opponents), finished in 12th place in the OAC, and were outscored opponents by a total of 231 to 37. The team ranked last in scoring defense, giving up 38.5 points per game.

Kenyon

The 1945 Kenyon Lords football team represented Kenyon College of Gambier, Ohio. Led by head coach Pat Pasini, the Lords compiled a 0–6 record (0–6 against OAC opponents), finished in 13th and last place in the OAC, and were outscored by a total of 224 to 13. They had the lowest scoring offense in the conference, averaging 2.2 points per game and failing to score any points in five of their six games.

References

 
Ohio Athletic Conference football